The  (literally "metal stick" or "metal club") is a spiked or studded two-handed war club used in feudal Japan by samurai. Other related weapons of this type are the nyoibo, konsaibo, and ararebo. Related solid iron weapons with no spikes or studs are the kanemuchi (or kanamuchi) and the aribo (also known as a gojo or kirikobo).

Description 
Kanabō and other related club-like weapons were constructed out of heavy wood or made entirely from iron, with iron spikes or studs on one end. For wooden kanabō, one or both ends could be covered with iron caps. Kanabō-type weapons came in all manner of shapes and sizes, with the largest ones being two-handed and as tall as a man, while smaller ones were primarily one-handed and the length of a forearm. 

Their shape could be similar to that of a baseball bat, with a thicker outer end tapering towards a slender handle with a pommel, or they could be straight all the way from the handle to the end. The shaft cross-section could be round (as in a baseball bat) or polygonal; that is, multi-faceted with flat surfaces arrayed around the central axis.

Mythology 
The kanabō was also a mythical weapon, often used in tales by oni, who reputedly possessed superhuman strength. This is alluded to by the Japanese saying "like giving a kanabō to an oni—meaning to give an extra advantage to someone who already has the advantage (i.e. the strong made stronger).

Gallery

See also
 Ararebo
 Bō
 Hanbō
 Tanbō
 Jō
 List of martial arts weapons
 Mace (bludgeon)
 War hammer
 Macuahuitl

References

External links 
 

Clubs and truncheons of Japan
Samurai clubs and truncheons